Bettina Böttinger (born 4 July 1956 in Düsseldorf) is a German television presenter and producer.

Life 
Böttinger studied German language and history at the University of Bonn.

In 1985 she began as a journalist at Westdeutscher Rundfunk. She worked for the television programme Aktuelle Stunde. As a television presenter, she worked during the 1990s and 2000s in programs including Hier und Heute, Parlazzo and B. trifft.

Böttinger lives as an open lesbian in Cologne and in the Eifel. She married Martina Wziontek on her 60th birthday.

Awards 
 2007: Order of Merit of the Federal Republic of Germany

References

External links 

 Bettina Böttinger
 WDR:Kölner Treff:Bettina Böttinger

1956 births
Living people
German television presenters
German television talk show hosts
German women television presenters
German women television journalists
German television journalists
Mass media people from Düsseldorf
Recipients of the Cross of the Order of Merit of the Federal Republic of Germany
German LGBT journalists
German LGBT broadcasters
20th-century German journalists
21st-century German journalists
Westdeutscher Rundfunk people
20th-century German women
21st-century German women
21st-century German LGBT people